Denie Pentecost  (born 23 April 1970) is an Australian film director and former international soccer player who played as a midfielder. She was a member of the Australia women's national soccer team at the 1994 OFC Women's Championship and 1995 FIFA Women's World Cup. At club level she played for Sydney Olympic in Australia. Pentecost directed the short film, Sexy Thing, that was in competition at the 2006 Cannes Film Festival.

References

1970 births
Living people
Australian women's soccer players
Australia women's international soccer players
Place of birth missing (living people)
1995 FIFA Women's World Cup players
Women's association football midfielders